66 Old Church Street in Chelsea, London, was designed in 1935–1936 for the politician and playwright Benn Levy by Walter Gropius and Maxwell Fry. Levy House formed part of a joint development with Cohen House, designed by Erich Mendelsohn and Serge Chermayeff for the publisher Denis Cohen. It was listed at Grade II in 1970.

66 Old Church Street is listed Grade II on the National Heritage List for England.

References

Chelsea, London
Houses completed in 1936
Walter Gropius buildings
Modernist architecture in London
Houses in the Royal Borough of Kensington and Chelsea
Grade II listed houses in London
Grade II listed buildings in the Royal Borough of Kensington and Chelsea